Plaisance is an arrondissement in the Nord Department of Haiti. As of 2015, the population was 123,633 inhabitants. Postal codes in the Plaisance Arrondissement start with the number 17.

Geography 
According to the Haitian Institute of Statistics and Informatics, the arrondissement has a total area of 93.56 square miles (242.32 km2).

Demographics

2003 Census 
As of the census of 2003, there were 90,812 people residing in the arrondissement.

2009 Estimated Census 
As of the estimated census of 2009, there were 112,428 people and 22,010 households residing in the arrondissement.

Postal codes in the Plaisance Arrondissement start with the number 17 .

Municipalities 
The arondissement consists of the following communes :
 Plaisance
 Pilate

References

Arrondissements of Haiti
Nord (Haitian department)